Damen is German for "Ladies". More specifically, it may refer to:

Surname
Damen (surname), a Dutch surname

Given name
Damen Auguste, a character from "The Immortals" novels
Damen Shaw (born 1974), Australian rules footballer
Damen Wheeler (born 1973), American football player

Chicago Transit Authority stations
Four stations on Damen Avenue (named after Father Arnold Damen)
Damen station (CTA Brown Line)
Damen station (CTA Blue Line) 
Damen station (CTA Pink Line)
Damen station (CTA Green Line), opening 2024

Other uses
Damen Group, a Dutch shipbuilding company
Damen (town) (大门镇), in Dongtou County, Zhejiang, China
Damen Island (大门岛), largest island of Dongtou County, Zhejiang, China
Damen Rural District, in Sistan and Baluchestan Province, Iran
Das Damen, American alternative rock band

See also 
 Dahmen, a municipality in Germany
 Dahmen (surname), a German surname